Andrew Hosmer (born March 1964) is an attorney, businessman and Democratic politician currently serving as the mayor of Laconia, New Hampshire.  He previously served two terms (2012-2016) in the New Hampshire Senate representing Senate District 7.  In the Senate, Hosmer served on the Commerce, Ways & Means, and Finance Committees. In his final Senate term (2015-2016), he was the Democratic Caucus Leader. Hosmer is also the general manager of AutoServ, his family's automotive business and is the father of four children.

References

External links
City of Laconia Staff Directory
Project Vote Smart profile
Twitter account

Democratic Party New Hampshire state senators
Living people
1964 births